Santa Elena is a Peruvian village located in Virú District, in La Libertad Region. It is located some 45 km south of Trujillo city.

Nearby places
Puerto Morín
Virú
Chao
Virú Valley

See also

Trujillo
Historic Centre of Trujillo
Chan Chan
Puerto Chicama
Chimú culture
Pacasmayo beach
Marcahuamachuco
Wiracochapampa
Salaverry
Buenos Aires
San Jose Festival
Huanchaco
Moche
Víctor Larco Herrera District
 Vista Alegre
Las Delicias beach
La Libertad Region
Trujillo Province, Peru
Virú culture
Lake Conache
Marinera Festival
Trujillo Spring Festival
Wetlands of Huanchaco

External links
 Map of Santa Elena by Wikimapia

References

Populated places in La Libertad Region